The 1921 Hereford by-election was held on 11 January 1921.  The by-election was held due to the resignation of the incumbent Coalition Unionist MP, Charles Pulley.  It was won by the Coalition Unionist candidate Samuel Roberts.

References

1921 in England
Politics of Hereford
1921 elections in the United Kingdom
By-elections to the Parliament of the United Kingdom in Herefordshire constituencies
20th century in Herefordshire